The  was held in 2013 in Yokohama, Kanagawa, Japan.

Awards
 Best Film: - The Kirishima Thing
 Best Director: Daihachi Yoshida - The Kirishima Thing
 Yoshimitsu Morita Memorial Best New Director:
 Masaaki Akahori - Sono Yoru no Samurai
 Yang Yong-hi - Our Homeland
 Best Screenplay: Kenji Uchida - Kagi Dorobō no Method
 Best Cinematographer: Ryūto Kondō - The Kirishima Thing
 Best Actor: Hiroshi Abe - Thermae Romae
 Best Actress: Takako Matsu - Yume Uru Futari
 Best Supporting Actor: Takayuki Yamada - Sono Yoru no Samurai, The Floating Castle and Lesson of the Evil
 Best Supporting Actress: Sakura Ando - Ai to Makoto and Sono Yoru no Samurai
 Best Newcomer:
 Masataka Kubota - Fugainai Boku wa Sora o Mita and Hasami hasami
 Ai Hashimoto - The Kirishima Thing, Another, Tsunagu, Home Itoshi no Zashikiwarashi
 Azusa Mine - Signal: Getsuyōbi no Ruka
 Examiner Special Award: Wolf Children director Mamoru Hosoda and production team
 Special Grand Prize: Nobuhiko Obayashi

Best 10
 The Kirishima Thing
 Kagi Dorobō no Method
 Kono Sora no Hana: Nagaoka Hanabi Monogatari
 A Terminal Trust
 Wolf Children
 Himizu
 Our Homeland
 Yume Uru Futari
 Oretachi Kyūkou A Ressha de Ikou
 Fugainai Boku wa Sora o Mita

runner-up. Ai to Makoto

References

Yokohama Film Festival
Yokohama Film Festival
Yokohama Film Festival
2013 in Japanese cinema